Doris Pole (born 4 June 1998) is a Croatian taekwondo practitioner.

She won a bronze medal in heavyweight at the 2019 World Taekwondo Championships, after being defeated by Zheng Shuyin in the semifinal.

References

1998 births
Living people
Croatian female taekwondo practitioners
World Taekwondo Championships medalists
21st-century Croatian women